Jason Brooks (born 1968) is a British painter and sculptor. He studied at Goldsmiths College before completing his BA at the Cheltenham & Gloucester College of Art & Design. Jason spent some time in the British School of Rome in 1990, then going on to receive his MA from the Chelsea College of Art & Design, London in 1992. He debuted among the YBAs in the 1990s with his black and white portraits. He won the NatWest art prize in 1999. Jason judged the NPG Portrait Prize, John Moores Prize and the Jerwood Prize and has gone on to exhibit globally since then.  His work is held in private and public collections all around the world, including the National Portrait Gallery Collection, London. A major overview of the artist’s work entitled Perpetual Orgy was published in 2015 to coincide with his solo show, 'Origins',  at Marlborough London.

Shows 
Brooks had his first one-man exhibition at the Entwistle Gallery in London in 1998. Since then he has shown regularly both in the UK and abroad, including a solo show at the National Portrait Gallery, London in 2008 of portraits, including Sir Paul Nurse, among others. Brooks is currently represented by Marlborough London, with his inaugural show at the gallery in 2013, entitled Ultraflesh. In 2015 Brooks' exhibition Origins brought together different techniques used throughout his career to create 8 paintings that drew initial influence from Gustave Courbet's 1886 paintingL'Origine du monde.

Solo exhibitions 
2015 Origins, Marlborough Contemporary, London

2013 Ultra Flesh, Marlborough Contemporary, London

2008 National Portrait Gallery, London

2006 Stellan Holm Gallery, New York

2005 Auto, Max Wigram Gallery, London

2002 Archimede Staffolini Gallery, Nicosia

2001 Harewood House, Harewood, Leeds

2000 Entwistle, London

1998 Entwistle, London

Selected exhibitions 
2015 “I never thought I´d see you again” Painting History, Marlborough
Contemporary, London

2012–2013 Beyond Reality, British Painting Today, Galerie Rudofinum, Prague

2011 Do You Believe?, 3812, Contemporary Art Projects, Hong Kong

2010 Straw Dogs, Spring Projects, London

Hyping the Real, Stephane Simoens Contemporary Fine Art, Knokke

2009 Capturing Claudia, Colnhaghi Gallery, London

40 Artists, 80 Drawings, The Drawing Gallery, Powys

2008 Unforgiven, Stellan Holm Gallery, New York

Formula One Project, Renault/ING, Monaco & London

Fresh Eyes, ING Headquarters, London

George Stubbs, Leeds City Art Gallery, Leeds (cat)

Larger Than Life, Stellen Holm Gallery, New York

2007 Timer, Triennale Bovisa, Milan

2006 Heads, Flowers East, London, UK Harewood House, Harewood, Leeds,
UK Museum of Art, Donna

Darkness Visible, Ferens Art Gallery, Hull & Southampton City Art Gallery

Drawing Breath, The Gallery at Wimbledon College of Art, London

2005 Appearance, Whitewall Waterfront, Leeds (cat.)

ID: Recent Purchases on the Theme of Identity Made through
the Contemporary Art Society’s Special Collection Scheme,
Ferens Art Gallery, Hull

2004 John Moores 23, Walker Art Gallery, Liverpool (cat.)

Blow Up!, St Paul’s Gallery, Birmingham (cat.)

2003 Yes! I am a long way from home, The Nunnery, London and UK tour (cat.)
Pale Fire, Nordenhake, Berlin

2002 Babel 2002, National Museum of Contemporary Art, Seoul (cat.)

2001 I am a Camera, The Saatchi Gallery, London (cat.)

2000 Psycho Some, Lombard Fried, New York

No FuN Without U: The Art of Factual Nonsense, Jeremy Cooper, London

1999 Painting Lab, Entwistle, London (cat.)

The NatWest Art Prize 1999, Lothbury Gallery, London (cat.)

The Flower Show, Harewood House, Harewood, Leeds

John Moores 21, Walker Art Gallery, Liverpool (cat.)

Fresh Paint, Scottish Gallery of Modern Art, Glasgow

National Dependency, Jerwood Gallery, London

1998 New Neurotic Realism, The Saatchi Gallery, London (cat.)

Postcards on Photography, Cambridge Darkroom, Cambridge

Near, Sharjah Art Museum, Sharjah (cat.)

1997 Likeness: Representing Sexualities, Manchester City Art Gallery, Manchester

John Moores 20, Walker Art Gallery, Liverpool (cat.)

1996 Trojan, Paton Gallery, London (cat.)

1995 Fellows’ Show, Pittville Gallery, Cheltenham

1994 Pet Show, 63 Union Street, London

UK Masks, Soho Gallery, London

BT Commission, Waterloo Station, London

1993 To Boldly Go…, Cubitt Gallery, London

BT New Contemporaries, Serpentine Gallery, London and UK tour (cat.)

1992 Abstractions from the Domestic Suburb Scene (SIN), Benjamin Rhodes Gallery, London

Collections 
Brooks’ work is represented  private and public collections worldwide, including the National Portrait Gallery in London, the Walker Art Gallery in Liverpool, and the Saatchi Collection, London.

Personal life 
Brooks lives and works between London and Gloucestershire. He lives with his partner Lucy Yeomans and their daughter. He also has another daughter from a previous marriage.

External links 
 http://www.jasonbrooks.com/

Footnotes 

1968 births
Living people
British painters